James or Jim Copeland may refer to:

 James Copeland (outlaw) (1823–1857), American outlaw
 James Copeland (actor) (1918–2002), Scottish actor
 Jim Copeland (Canadian football) (born 1939), Canadian football player
 Jim Copeland (American football) (1945–2010), American football player and college athletics administrator
 Jim Copeland (cyclist) (born 1962), American cyclist